The Regar (Raigar, Rehgar, Raigarh,  Ranigar, Rohit ,Rehgarh is the Ethnic group of Chamar Jatav) caste are found in  the states of Punjab, Haryana, Gujarat, Himachal Pradesh and Rajasthan in India's Scheduled Caste. They are known as Regar in the Mewar region of Rajasthan.

At the beginning of the 20th century, the British Raj administration imposed restrictions on the indigenous manufacturing of saltpetre which destroyed their livelihood.

References

Social groups of Rajasthan
Social groups of Gujarat